Peski is a rural locality (a selo) and the administrative center of Peskovskoye Rural Settlement, Petropavlovsky District, Voronezh Oblast, Russia. The population was 1,402 as of 2010. There are 12 streets.

Geography 
Peski is located 20 km north of Petropavlovka (the district's administrative centre) by road. Staraya Melovaya is the nearest rural locality.

References 

Rural localities in Petropavlovsky District, Voronezh Oblast